FS1 is an American sports-oriented cable and satellite television channel.

FS1 may also refer to:
 FS1 (Austrian TV channel), a community television station in Salzburg, Austria
 Former name of the Austrian TV station ORF eins
 Socket FS1, a CPU socket that is implemented in notebook computer platforms from AMD
 Yamaha FS1, a moped of the 1970s
 Microsoft Flight Simulator 1.0 (FS1), see History of Microsoft Flight Simulator
FS1 (Lightvessel), unmanned German lightship
 Foundation Stage 1, term used for nursery education in England

See also
 1 FS, USAF 1st fighter squadron
 FS (disambiguation)
 FSI (disambiguation)